Ilídio José Panzo is an Angolan footballer who plays as a midfielder for InterClube.

External links 
 

1993 births
Living people
Association football midfielders
Angolan footballers
Angola international footballers
2013 Africa Cup of Nations players